Malinverni is an Italian surname. Notable people with the surname include:

Ermando Malinverni (1919–1993), Italian footballer
Giorgio Malinverni (born 1941), Swiss judge and law professor
Stefano Malinverni (born 1959), Italian sprinter

Italian-language surnames